Wei-chi may refer to:
The game of go
The Chinese word for "crisis"